The Winnipeg Monarchs were a junior ice hockey team that played in the Western Canada Hockey League from 1967 to 1977 under three names. The team played as the Winnipeg Jets from 1967 to 1973; the Winnipeg Clubs from 1973 to 1976, and the Winnipeg Monarchs from 1976 to 1977. The Monarchs franchise played at Winnipeg Arena in Winnipeg, Manitoba. The team was the direct namesake for the Winnipeg Jets professional hockey club that began play in 1972; the junior Jets changed their name to disambiguate themselves in 1973.

In 1977 the Monarchs moved to Calgary to become the Calgary Wranglers. They are today the Lethbridge Hurricanes.

Season-by-season record
Note: GP = Games played, W = Wins, L = Losses, T = Ties, Pts = Points, GF = Goals for, GA = Goals against

See also
List of ice hockey teams in Manitoba
Lethbridge Hurricanes

1967 establishments in Manitoba
1977 disestablishments in Manitoba
Defunct Western Hockey League teams
History of the Winnipeg Jets
Ice hockey clubs established in 1967
Ice hockey clubs disestablished in 1977
Winnipeg Monarchs